Michael, Mike or Mick Harrison may refer to:

Michael Harrison (announcer), soldier and BBC radio presenter
Michael Harrison (cricketer) (born 1978), English cricketer
Michael Harrison (lawyer) (1823–1895), Irish lawyer and judge, Solicitor-General for Ireland
Michael Harrison (musician), American composer, pianist and creator of the “harmonic piano,” an extensively modified seven-foot grand piano
Michael Harrison (politician) (born 1958), member of the Tennessee House of Representatives
Michael Harrison (writer) (1907–1991), English detective fiction and fantasy author
Michael A. Harrison, American computer scientist, pioneer in formal languages
Michael Allen Harrison, American New Age musician, songwriter and pianist
M. John Harrison (born 1945), British author of science fiction, fantasy and literary fiction
Michael R. Harrison (born 1943), director of pediatric surgery at UCSF
Michael S. Harrison, American police officer
J. Michael Harrison (born 1944), American researcher in operations research
Mike Harrison (bishop) (born 1963), Church of England bishop
Mike Harrison (footballer, born 1940) (1940–2019), English footballer
Mike Harrison (footballer, born 1952), English footballer
Mike Harrison (musician) (1945–2018), English musician, singer with Spooky Tooth
Mike Harrison (rugby union) (born 1956), English rugby union player
Mick Harrison (rugby league), English rugby league footballer who played in the 1960s and 1970s
Michael Harrison, early pseudonym for Sunset Carson, American actor
Mick Harrison (comic books), pseudonym of Randy Stradley